Ceratobunoides is a genus of harvestmen in the family Sclerosomatidae from Sumatra.

Species
 Ceratobunoides sumatranus Roewer, 1923
 Ceratobunoides bandarensis Roewer, 1955

References

Harvestmen